Kuningamäe is a village in Põltsamaa Parish, Jõgeva County, Estonia. It is located just west of the town of Põltsamaa. Kuningamäe has a populstion of 84 (as of 2010).

Earlier Kuningamäe was a location of Vana-Põltsamaa Manor's cattle manor Königsberg, which has also been associated with the residence of Duke Magnus. In 1766 Johann Woldemar von Lauw established a hospital and pharmacy in Kuningamäe. The director Peter Ernst Wilde founded a medical school and a print shop where he published the first Estonian periodical Lühhike öppetus and the first Estonian medical manual Arsti ramat.

References

External links
Kuningamäe kart circuit 

Villages in Jõgeva County
Kreis Fellin